Hypoxis juncea (commonly known as fringed yellow star-grass and rushy hypoxis) is a star-grass species with leaves that are so narrow as to be comparable to thread. It is not a true grass, despite the common name. It is found in the United States on coastal plains from Florida + Alabama to North Carolina. The species is a facultative wetland perennial forb.

References

juncea
Flora of the Southeastern United States
Plants described in 1792
Flora without expected TNC conservation status